Spreeta is an electro-optical device utilizing surface plasmon resonance to detect small changes in refractive index of liquids.  The Spreeta device was developed by Texas Instruments, Inc. in the 1990s.  Device design incorporates a light-emitting diode (LED) illuminating a thin metal film (usually gold) in the Kretchmann geometry (needed to excite surface plasmons).  The reflected light is detected by a photodiode linear array (which translates angle of reflection to pixel position) and the resonance (a dip in the reflectivity at a specific angle of incidence) denotes the refractive index on the outer surface of the metal film.  Applications include real-time measurement of binding of antigens to antibodies attached to the sensor surface, monitoring changes in oil quality, and measuring sugar content in drinks (Brix level).

The term "Spreeta" is an anglic derivative of SPR-ITA which combines SPR (for Surface Plasmon Resonance) with "ita" (a Spanish suffix meaning "small").

References 
 U.S. Patent Number 5912456 - Filed Mar 19, 1997 - Texas Instruments Incorporated 

Sensors
Texas Instruments hardware
Plasmonics